Monroe–Walton County Airport  is a city-owned, public-use airport located one nautical mile (2 km) southeast of the central business district of Monroe, a city in Walton County, Georgia, United States. It is included in the National Plan of Integrated Airport Systems for 2011–2015, which categorized it as a general aviation facility.

Facilities and aircraft 
Monroe–Walton County Airport covers an area of 70 acres (28 ha) at an elevation of 875 feet (267 m) above mean sea level. It has one runway designated 3/21 with an asphalt surface measuring 5,000 by 75 feet (1,524 x 23 m).

For the 12-month period ending June 27, 2011, the airport had 13,000 general aviation aircraft operations, an average of 35 per day. At that time there were 40 aircraft based at this airport: 80% single-engine, 3% multi-engine, 5% helicopter, and 13% glider.

References

External links 
 D73 – Monroe–Walton County Airport at Georgia DOT website
 Aerial image as of February 1999 from USGS The National Map
 
 

Airports in Georgia (U.S. state)
Buildings and structures in Walton County, Georgia
Transportation in Walton County, Georgia